The Olaya Towers (Arabic: أبراج العليا) are a pair of skyscrapers on Olaya Street in Riyadh, Saudi Arabia.

See also 
 List of tallest buildings in Saudi Arabia .

Gallery

References

Skyscrapers in Riyadh